Kingsley Wayne Dixon  (Ph.D.) is an Australian botanist currently working as a professor at Curtin University. He was the founding Director of Science at Kings Park and Botanic Gardens, and helped to establish the laboratories there as among the world's leading.

Early life
Dixon grew up in the Perth suburb of Morley, Western Australia. He would spend his time exploring the bushland that existed in the suburb during his childhood, which encouraged his interest in botany.

Career
Dixon received a Bachelor of Science (Hons) and a PhD from the University of Western Australia (UWA). Dixon was the founding Director of Science at Kings Park and Botanic Gardens from 1982 to 2014. Before working as a professor at Curtin University, he was a professor at UWA.

One of Dixon's most notable achievements is the 1992 discovery of smoke as a cause for the germination of Australian plants after bushfires. He later helped to show that plant species in other parts of the world also have germination caused by smoke, showing that this is not exclusive to plants in fire-prone regions. After this, he started a study with scientists from UWA and Murdoch University to discover the specific chemicals in smoke that cause this effect, testing over 4,000 chemicals and eventually discovering a new molecule, named karrikinolide, after "karrik", the noongar word for "smoke". The discovery was published in Science in 2004.

Dixon featured on David Attenborough's documentary The Private Life of Plants in 2001.

In December 2017, Dixon became a member of the Lotterywest board.

Plant species first described by Dixon include Caladenia rosea, Caladenia lateritica, Desmocladus glomeratus and Rhizanthella johnstonii. Caleana dixonii was first identified as a distinct species by and named after Dixon.

Awards
 Golden Gecko Awards for Environmental Excellence (1997, 2000, 2008)
 Australian Minerals Energy Environment Foundations Awards of Environmental Excellence (1992, 1996)
 UWA Chancellor’s Medal (2010)
 UWA Award of Honour (2013)
 Linnean Medal (2013)
 Western Australian Scientist of the Year (2016)
Fellow of the Australian Academy of Technology and Engineering (2020)

See also
 Halliday House

References

External links
Curtin University staff profile

Academic staff of Curtin University
University of Western Australia alumni
Kings Park, Western Australia
20th-century Australian botanists
Linnean Medallists
1954 births
Living people
21st-century Australian botanists